In Japan, The Emperor refers to:

 Naruhito (born 1960), Emperor since 2019

The Emperor may also refer to any Monarch of any monarchy, as well as to:

People 
 Papoose, icon, etc.
 Remy Ma, legend, etc.
 Bob Hudson (1929–1997), American radio DJ, one half of comedy duo Hudson & Landry
 Fatih Terim, a Turkish association football manager and former player.
 Lim Yo-hwan (also known as SlayerS_`BoxeR`), a professional gamer.

Fictional characters 
 Emperor Palpatine, a character from the Star Wars franchise
 The God-Emperor of Mankind, in the science-fiction universe Warhammer 40,000

Literature 
 The Emperor (book), a book by Ryszard Kapuściński on the last days of Emperor Haile Selassie of Ethiopia
 "The Emperor" (short story), written by Frederick Forsyth

Film 
 The Emperor (film)

Other 
 The Emperor (Tarot card)
 Piano Concerto No. 5 (Beethoven)
 Morpho peleides (the emperor), a butterfly
 Holy Roman Emperor

See also
 Emperor
 Emperor (disambiguation)
 The Chancellor (disambiguation)